Kirby Underdale is a village and civil parish in the East Riding of Yorkshire, England.

The civil parish is formed by the village of Kirby Underdale and the hamlets of Garrowby, Painsthorpe and Uncleby.
According to the 2011 UK Census, Kirby Underdale parish had a population of 125, a decrease on the 2001 UK Census figure of 129.

The church, dedicated to All Saints, was designated a Grade I listed building in 1987 and is now recorded in the National Heritage List for England, maintained by Historic England.

In Baines 1823 History, Directory and Gazetteer of the County of York, Kirby Underdale village and parish was listed as "Kirby Guderdale", and was in the Wapentake of Buckrose. All Saints' Church and its benefice was in the patronage of King George IV. Population at the time was 385, which included two farmers, one of whom was a butcher, a blacksmith, a grocer, and a carpenter.

The population by 1840 was 293, with parish occupations that included twenty-one farmers, two wheelwrights, two shopkeepers, a tailor, a woodman, and a gamekeeper. Further residents were a schoolmaster and schoolmistress, a parish clerk, a yeoman, and the parish incumbent at the rectory.

References

External links

Villages in the East Riding of Yorkshire
Civil parishes in the East Riding of Yorkshire